Przesiadłów  is a village in the administrative district of Gmina Ujazd, within Tomaszów Mazowiecki County, Łódź Voivodeship, in central Poland.

History
In 1827, Przesiadłów had a population of 70.

During the German occupation of Poland (World War II), the occupiers operated a forced labour camp for Poles and Jews at a local sawmill.

References

Villages in Tomaszów Mazowiecki County